The Allstate is a badge engineered version of the Henry J American automobile that was offered for sale through Sears, Roebuck during the 1952 and 1953 model years.

History
The Sears retail chain had previously marketed vehicles made by the Lincoln Motor Car Works under the name "Sears Motor Buggy" between 1908 and 1912. These horseless carriages were of the "high-wheeler" variety with large wagon-type wheels. Their high ground clearance was well-suited to muddy, wagon-rutted country roads. Customers were accustomed to mail-ordering through the Sears catalog, and the Sears Motor Buggy could be delivered to the nearest railroad siding.

Development
The Allstate was the brainchild of Henry J. Kaiser, who saw Sears as another means to mass-market his slow-selling "Henry J" two-door sedan, introduced in 1950.

The Allstate was essentially a Henry J, but with a number of differences that included Allstate badges on the hood and rear deck, a more upscale interior of Saran plaid or occasionally leather or smooth vinyl, special hubcaps/wheel covers, horn buttons and instrument bezels, a locking glove box and trunk lid, special engine color (blue), custom armrests and sunvisors, revised door locks and keys, and special parking and taillamp assemblies. Most notably, the Allstate featured a unique two-bar grille and jet-plane hood ornament designed by Alex Tremulis, who had come to Kaiser-Frazer from the Tucker Corporation.

Allstate automobiles were planned to be built on the senior Kaiser platforms, but following three years of negotiations between Kaiser-Frazer and Sears, the production Allstate was announced on November 20, 1951, by Sears merchandising vice president Theodore V. Houser and Kaiser-Frazer administrative vice-president Eugene Trefethen. The three-year delay was due in part to tension from existing Kaiser-Frazer dealerships fearing competition with Sears.

Production
The Allstate was built by Kaiser-Frazer in Willow Run, Michigan, (and after 1953 by Kaiser-Willys in Toledo, Ohio) and was based on Kaiser's compact Henry J. One body style was offered, a fastback two-door sedan in two lines, the Series 4 and the Series 6.

For 1952, the Series 4 came in the Model 111 Standard (the best seller at US1,486) and Model 113 DeLuxe ($1,539) trim versions, and was also available in an austere Model 110 Basic version for $1,395. The Series 6 Basic was priced at $1,594 and the well-trimmed, swift Model 115 DeLuxe was offered at $1,693. (The Standard was never offered in the Series 6.) The cars had a  wheelbase. The marketing slogan was "Your one brand new car for '52! Allstate!"

Virtually no appearance changes were made for 1953 but Allstate cars weighed as much as  more than their 1952 counterparts.
All the Allstate Basic models were dropped and Allstate prices jumped substantially; the entry-level Series 4 Standard Model 210 sold for $1,528 and the DeLuxe Model 213 for $1,589. The Series 6 was now only offered in the upscale DeLuxe Model 215 version at $1,785, and was the most popular Allstate that year.

The standard Allstate interior material was made from tightly-twisted strands of paper that were woven together and then coated in plastic, which proved to be unusually durable as well as attractive and eliminated the need for seat covers. Seat covers were popular in the 1950s, and many were made of this same type of material.

Unlike early Henry Js, which were built without trunk lids to reduce costs, Allstates offered opening trunk lids.

Series 4 cars used an  L-head four-cylinder   engine, and the Series 6 was powered by a  L-head six , both powerplants built by Willys. A three-speed manual transmission was standard, with overdrive available for $104 extra.

One mechanical difference between Allstate and Henry J was that Allstates were equipped with Allstate-brand tires, tubes, spark plugs and batteries, all with their own Sears "Triple Guarantee" warranties.

Initially, the Allstate  was offered only in the south and southwest United States, with plans to expand distribution as demand for the product grew. Sears locations selling Allstates included  Baytown, Texas; Beaumont, Texas; Birmingham, Alabama; Dallas, Texas; Fayetteville, North Carolina; Houston, Texas; Jackson, Mississippi; Knoxville, Tennessee; Little Rock, Arkansas; Lubbock, Texas; Memphis, Tennessee; Norfolk, Virginia; Orlando, Florida; Phoenix, Arizona; Portsmouth, Virginia; Richmond, Virginia; Salt Lake City, Utah; and Waco, Texas.

While some Sears outlets tried to stock at least one sample of the car, most were built on demand by Kaiser-Frazer, which made delivery to the store where they were sold. Kaiser-Frazer urged its dealers to service Allstate cars when asked. Many Kaiser-Frazer dealers were displeased to see "their cars" sold by another outlet, especially since the Allstate carried more standard equipment, yet sold at a lower price than the Henry J.

Sears marketed the car as "the lowest-priced full-sized sedan on the U.S. market." However, Sears did not accept trade-ins from Allstate buyers, and there may have been reluctance to buy a car through a department store where service was thought to be questionable. (The lack of a trade-in program proved to be a serious impediment to the sale of Graham-Bradley tractors from Graham-Paige Motors Corp. by Sears in the late 1930s.)

Only 2,363 Allstates were sold in two model years before the marque was discontinued; 1,566 during 1952 and 797 in 1953. Kaiser soon discontinued the Henry J as well.

See also
 Allstate (vehicle brand)

References

External links

 The Allstate at RemarkableCars.com
 The list of Allstate cars in automobile-catalog.com
 The 1952-1952 Allstate at Howstuffworks.com

Kaiser Motors
Kaiser vehicles
Vehicle manufacturing companies established in 1952
Cars introduced in 1952
Compact cars
Sedans
Rear-wheel-drive vehicles
Sears Holdings
Motor vehicles manufactured in the United States
Defunct motor vehicle manufacturers of the United States

sv:Henry J#Allstate